Cho Won-woo (born April 8, 1971) is the former professional baseball manager of the Lotte Giants of the KBO League.

References

External links
Career statistics and player information from the KBO League

1971 births
Living people
Doosan Bears coaches
Hanwha Eagles coaches
Hanwha Eagles players
KBO League outfielders
Lotte Giants coaches
Lotte Giants managers
Nippon Professional Baseball coaches
SSG Landers players
South Korean baseball coaches
South Korean baseball managers
South Korean baseball players
South Korean expatriate baseball people in Japan
Sportspeople from Busan
Ssangbangwool Raiders players